The North Macedonia national under-21 football team is a youth association football national team which represents North Macedonia at this age level and is a feeder team for the North Macedonia national football team. It was formerly known as the Macedonia national under-21 football team.

This team is for Macedonian players aged 21 or under at the start of a two-year European Under-21 Football Championship campaign, so players can be, and often are, up to 23 years old. Also in existence are teams for Under-20s (for non-UEFA tournaments), Under-19s and Under 17s. As long as they are eligible, players can play at any level, making it possible to play for the U21s, senior side and again for the U21s. It is also possible to play for one country at youth level and another at senior level (providing the player is eligible).

The under-21 age category came into existence with the realignment of UEFA's youth competitions in 1976. The Macedonia U21 team was formed following Macedonia's independence from SFR Yugoslavia in 1991 and is controlled by the Football Federation of North Macedonia (from 1976 to 1992 Macedonian players played for Yugoslavia U21). A 7–0 win in a friendly against Estonia played on 31 May 1994 was Macedonia U21s' first result. Four months later, Macedonia also had their first competitive match which ended in a 5–3 win against Denmark.

So far, the team has qualified for one final tournament, the one being the 2017 Euro U21 held in Poland for players born 1994 or later. They ended the tournament on the 11th position with 1 draw and 2 losses over the group stage.

UEFA U-21 Championship Record

2017 UEFA European Under-21 Championship

Qualification

Final tournament

Group stage

2021 UEFA European Under-21 Championship

Qualification

2023 UEFA European Under-21 Championship

Qualification

Recent results and fixtures

Generation 2002+

* Macedonia's scores are always listed first

Squad

Current squad
Squad named for the friendly games against Latvia, Finland and Slovakia on 23, 25 and 28 March 2023.Caps and goals as of 22 November 2022, after the match against Serbia.

Recent call-ups
Players that have been called up within the past 12 months and are eligible for the 2023 European U21 Football Championship Qualifiers.

A: Called up by the Macedonia A National Team
U19: Called up by the Macedonia U19 National Team
INJ: Injured 
WD: Withdrew

Current First Squad

Past squads
 2017 UEFA European Under-21 Football Championship squad

Statistics

Most appearances

Top goalscorers

See also 
 Macedonia national football team
 Macedonia national under-19 football team
 Macedonia national under-17 football team
 European Under-21 Football Championship

References

External links
 MacedonianFootball Contains news and information about the Macedonian U-21 National Football Team.
 UEFA Under-21 website Contains full results archive
 The Rec.Sport.Soccer Statistics Foundation Contains full record of U-21/U-23 Championships.

 
European national under-21 association football teams
Macedonia
Macedonia